John Nigel Burndred (born 23 March 1968) is an English former footballer who played for Knypersley Victoria, Port Vale, Stafford Rangers, and Newcastle Town.

Career
Burndred played for Knypersley Victoria, where he won the Midland Football Alliance golden boot with 31 goals in the 1994–95 season, before joining his favourite club Port Vale in February 1995, initially on trial. He made his First Division debut at Vale Park in a 1–1 draw with Notts County on 7 May 1995, the last day of the 1994–95 season, but "Valiants" manager John Rudge allowed him to leave on a free transfer later that month. After a trial with Walsall he moved back into non-league football with Stafford Rangers (Southern League) and Newcastle Town.

During his long periods of non-league football he worked as a manager at a Burslem pottery firm.

Career statistics
Source:

References

Footballers from Stoke-on-Trent
English footballers
Association football forwards
Knypersley Victoria F.C. players
Port Vale F.C. players
Walsall F.C. players
Stafford Rangers F.C. players
Newcastle Town F.C. players
Midland Football Alliance players
English Football League players
Southern Football League players
1968 births
Living people